In mathematical statistics, the Fisher information (sometimes simply called information) is a way of measuring the amount of information that an observable random variable X carries about an unknown parameter θ of a distribution that models X. Formally, it is the variance of the score, or the expected value of the observed information.

The role of the Fisher information in the asymptotic theory of maximum-likelihood estimation was emphasized by the statistician Ronald Fisher (following some initial results by Francis Ysidro Edgeworth). The Fisher information matrix is used to calculate the covariance matrices associated with maximum-likelihood estimates. It can also be used in the formulation of test statistics, such as the Wald test.

In Bayesian statistics, the Fisher information plays a role in the derivation of non-informative prior distributions according to Jeffreys' rule. It also appears as the large-sample covariance of the posterior distribution, provided that the prior is sufficiently smooth (a result known as Bernstein–von Mises theorem, which was anticipated by Laplace for exponential families). The same result is used when approximating the posterior with Laplace's approximation, where the Fisher information appears as the covariance of the fitted Gaussian.

Statistical systems of a scientific nature (physical, biological, etc.) whose likelihood functions obey shift invariance have been shown to obey maximum Fisher information. The level of the maximum depends upon the nature of the system constraints.

Definition
The Fisher information is a way of measuring the amount of information that an observable random variable  carries about an unknown parameter  upon which the probability of  depends.

Under certain regularity conditions, if  is the true parameter (i.e.  is actually distributed as ), it can be shown that the expected value (the first moment) of the score, evaluated at the true parameter value , is 0: 

The Fisher information is defined to be the variance of the score:

Note that . A random variable carrying high Fisher information implies that the absolute value of the score is often high. The Fisher information is not a function of a particular observation, as the random variable X has been averaged out.

If  is twice differentiable with respect to θ, and under certain regularity conditions, then the Fisher information may also be written as

since

and

Thus, the Fisher information may be seen as the curvature of the support curve (the graph of the log-likelihood). Near the maximum likelihood estimate, low Fisher information therefore indicates that the maximum appears "blunt", that is, the maximum is shallow and there are many nearby values with a similar log-likelihood. Conversely, high Fisher information indicates that the maximum is sharp.

Regularity conditions 
The regularity conditions are as follows:

 The partial derivative of f(X; θ) with respect to θ exists almost everywhere. (It can fail to exist on a null set, as long as this set does not depend on θ.)
 The integral of f(X; θ) can be differentiated under the integral sign with respect to θ.
 The support of f(X; θ) does not depend on θ.

If θ is a vector then the regularity conditions must hold for every component of θ. It is easy to find an example of a density that does not satisfy the regularity conditions: The density of a Uniform(0, θ) variable fails to satisfy conditions 1 and 3. In this case, even though the Fisher information can be computed from the definition, it will not have the properties it is typically assumed to have.

In terms of likelihood 
Because the likelihood of θ given X is always proportional to the probability f(X; θ), their logarithms necessarily differ by a constant that is independent of θ, and the derivatives of these logarithms with respect to θ are necessarily equal.

Samples of any size 
The value X can represent a single sample drawn from a single distribution or can represent a collection of samples drawn from a collection of distributions.  If there are n samples and the corresponding n distributions are statistically independent then the Fisher information will necessarily be the sum of the single-sample Fisher information values, one for each single sample from its distribution.  In particular, if the n distributions are independent and identically distributed then the Fisher information will necessarily be n times the Fisher information of a single sample from the common distribution.

Informal derivation of the Cramér–Rao bound
The Cramér–Rao bound states that the inverse of the Fisher information is a lower bound on the variance of any unbiased estimator of θ. H.L. Van Trees (1968) and B. Roy Frieden (2004) provide the following method of deriving the Cramér–Rao bound, a result which describes use of the Fisher information.

Informally, we begin by considering an unbiased estimator . Mathematically, "unbiased" means that

This expression is zero independent of θ, so its partial derivative with respect to θ must also be zero. By the product rule, this partial derivative is also equal to

For each θ, the likelihood function is a probability density function, and therefore .

Using these two facts in the above, we get

Factoring the integrand gives

Squaring the expression in the integral, the Cauchy–Schwarz inequality yields

The second bracketed factor is defined to be the Fisher Information, while the first bracketed factor is the expected mean-squared error of the estimator . By rearranging, the inequality tells us that

In other words, the precision to which we can estimate θ is fundamentally limited by the Fisher information of the likelihood function.

Single-parameter Bernoulli experiment
A Bernoulli trial is a random variable with two possible outcomes, "success" and "failure", with success having a probability of θ. The outcome can be thought of as determined by a coin toss, with the probability of heads being θ and the probability of tails being .

Let X be a Bernoulli trial. The Fisher information contained in X may be calculated to be

Because Fisher information is additive, the Fisher information contained in n independent Bernoulli trials is therefore

This is the reciprocal of the variance of the mean number of successes in n Bernoulli trials, so in this case, the Cramér–Rao bound is an equality.

Matrix form
When there are N parameters, so that θ is an  vector  then the Fisher information takes the form of an  matrix.  This matrix is called the Fisher information matrix (FIM) and has typical element

The FIM is a  positive semidefinite matrix.  If it is positive definite, then it defines a Riemannian metric on the N-dimensional parameter space.  The topic information geometry uses this to connect Fisher information to differential geometry, and in that context, this metric is known as the Fisher information metric.

Under certain regularity conditions, the Fisher information matrix may also be written as

The result is interesting in several ways:
It can be derived as the Hessian of the relative entropy.
It can be used as a Riemannian metric for defining Fisher-Rao geometry when it is positive-definite.
It can be understood as a metric induced from the Euclidean metric, after appropriate change of variable.
In its complex-valued form, it is the Fubini–Study metric.
It is the key part of the proof of Wilks' theorem, which allows confidence region estimates for maximum likelihood estimation (for those conditions for which it applies) without needing the Likelihood Principle.
In cases where the analytical calculations of the FIM above are difficult, it is possible to form an average of easy Monte Carlo estimates of the Hessian of the negative log-likelihood function as an estimate of the FIM. The estimates may be based on values of the negative log-likelihood function or the gradient of the negative log-likelihood function; no analytical calculation of the Hessian of the negative log-likelihood function is needed.

Orthogonal parameters
We say that two parameters θi and θj are orthogonal if the element of the ith row and jth column of the Fisher information matrix is zero. Orthogonal parameters are easy to deal with in the sense that their  maximum likelihood estimates are independent and can be calculated separately. When dealing with research problems, it is very common for the researcher to invest some time searching for an orthogonal parametrization of the densities involved in the problem.

Singular statistical model

If the Fisher information matrix is positive definite for all , then the corresponding statistical model is said to be regular; otherwise, the statistical model is said to be singular. Examples of singular statistical models include the following: normal mixtures, binomial mixtures, multinomial mixtures, Bayesian networks, neural networks, radial basis functions, hidden Markov models, stochastic context-free grammars, reduced rank regressions, Boltzmann machines.

In machine learning, if a statistical model is devised so that it extracts hidden structure from a random phenomenon, then it naturally becomes singular.

Multivariate normal distribution
The FIM for a N-variate multivariate normal distribution,  has a special form. Let the K-dimensional vector of parameters be  and the vector of random normal variables be .

where  denotes the transpose of a vector,  denotes the trace of a square matrix, and:

 

Note that a special, but very common, case is the one where , a constant. Then

In this case the Fisher information matrix may be identified with the coefficient matrix of the normal equations of least squares estimation theory.

Another special case occurs when the mean and covariance depend on two different vector parameters, say, β and θ. This is especially popular in the analysis of spatial data, which often uses a linear model with correlated residuals. In this case,

 

where

Properties

Chain rule
Similar to the entropy or mutual information, the Fisher information also possesses a chain rule decomposition. In particular, if X and Y are jointly distributed random variables, it follows that: 

As a special case, if the two random variables are independent, the information yielded by the two random variables is the sum of the information from each random variable separately:

Consequently, the information in a random sample of n independent and identically distributed observations is n times the information in a sample of size 1.

F-divergence 
That is, it's the distribution with pdf .

In this form, it is clear that the Fisher information matrix is a Riemannian metric, and varies correctly under a change of variables. (see section on Reparametrization)

Sufficient statistic
The information provided by a sufficient statistic is the same as that of the sample X. This may be seen by using Neyman's factorization criterion for a sufficient statistic. If T(X) is sufficient for θ, then

for some functions g and h.  The independence of h(X) from θ implies

and the equality of information then follows from the definition of Fisher information. More generally, if  is a statistic, then

with equality if and only if T is a sufficient statistic.

Reparametrization
The Fisher information depends on the parametrization of the problem. If θ and η are two scalar parametrizations of an estimation problem, and θ is a continuously differentiable function of η, then

where the (i, j)th element of the k × k Jacobian matrix  is defined by
 
and where  is the matrix transpose of 

In information geometry, this is seen as a change of coordinates on a Riemannian manifold, and the intrinsic properties of curvature are unchanged under different parametrizations. In general, the Fisher information matrix provides a Riemannian metric (more precisely, the Fisher–Rao metric) for the manifold of thermodynamic states, and can be used as an information-geometric complexity measure for a classification of phase transitions, e.g., the scalar curvature of the thermodynamic metric tensor diverges at (and only at) a phase transition point.

In the thermodynamic context, the Fisher information matrix is directly related to the rate of change in the corresponding order parameters. In particular, such relations identify second-order phase transitions via divergences of individual elements of the Fisher information matrix.

Isoperimetric inequality
The Fisher information matrix plays a role in an inequality like the isoperimetric inequality. Of all probability distributions with a given entropy, the one whose Fisher information matrix has the smallest trace is the Gaussian distribution. This is like how, of all bounded sets with a given volume, the sphere has the smallest surface area.

The proof involves taking a multivariate random variable  with density function  and adding a location parameter to form a family of densities .

where  is a Gaussian variable with covariance matrix . The name "surface area" is apt because the entropy power  is the volume of the "effective support set," so  is the "derivative" of the volume of the effective support set, much like the Minkowski-Steiner formula. The remainder of the proof uses the entropy power inequality, which is like the Brunn–Minkowski inequality.

Applications

Optimal design of experiments
Fisher information is widely used in optimal experimental design. Because of the reciprocity of estimator-variance and Fisher information, minimizing the variance corresponds to maximizing the information.

When the linear (or linearized) statistical model has several parameters, the mean of the parameter estimator is a vector and its variance is a matrix. The inverse of the variance matrix is called the "information matrix". Because the variance of the estimator of a parameter vector is a matrix, the problem of "minimizing the variance" is complicated. Using statistical theory, statisticians compress the information-matrix using real-valued summary statistics; being real-valued functions, these "information criteria" can be maximized.

Traditionally, statisticians have evaluated estimators and designs by considering some summary statistic of the covariance matrix (of an unbiased estimator), usually with positive real values (like the determinant or matrix trace). Working with positive real numbers brings several advantages: If the estimator of a single parameter has a positive variance, then the variance and the Fisher information are both positive real numbers; hence they are members of the convex cone of nonnegative real numbers (whose nonzero members have reciprocals in this same cone).

For several parameters, the covariance matrices and information matrices are elements of the convex cone of nonnegative-definite symmetric matrices in a partially ordered vector space, under the Loewner (Löwner) order. This cone is closed under matrix addition and inversion, as well as under the multiplication of positive real numbers and matrices. An exposition of matrix theory and Loewner order appears in Pukelsheim.

The traditional optimality criteria are the information matrix's invariants, in the sense of invariant theory; algebraically, the traditional optimality criteria are functionals of the eigenvalues of the (Fisher) information matrix (see optimal design).

Jeffreys prior in Bayesian statistics
In Bayesian statistics, the Fisher information is used to calculate the Jeffreys prior, which is a standard, non-informative prior for continuous distribution parameters.

Computational neuroscience
The Fisher information has been used to find bounds on the accuracy of neural codes. In that case, X is typically the joint responses of many neurons representing a low dimensional variable θ (such as a stimulus parameter). In particular the role of correlations in the noise of the neural responses has been studied.

Derivation of physical laws
Fisher information plays a central role in a controversial principle put forward by Frieden as the basis of physical laws, a claim that has been disputed.

Machine learning 
The Fisher information is used in machine learning techniques such as elastic weight consolidation, which reduces catastrophic forgetting in artificial neural networks.

Fisher information can be used as an alternative to the Hessian of the loss function in second-order gradient descent network training.

Relation to relative entropy

Fisher information is related to relative entropy. The relative entropy, or Kullback–Leibler divergence, between two distributions  and  can be written as

Then the Kullback–Leibler divergence, between two distributions in the family can be written as

But the second order derivative can be written as 

Thus the Fisher information represents the curvature of the relative entropy of a conditional distribution with respect to its parameters.

History
The Fisher information was discussed by several early statisticians, notably F. Y. Edgeworth. For example, Savage says: "In it [Fisher information], he [Fisher] was to some extent anticipated (Edgeworth 1908–9 esp. 502, 507–8, 662, 677–8, 82–5 and references he [Edgeworth] cites including Pearson and Filon 1898 [. . .])." There are a number of early historical sources and a number of reviews of this early work.

See also
Efficiency (statistics)
Observed information
Fisher information metric
Formation matrix
Information geometry
Jeffreys prior
Cramér–Rao bound
Minimum Fisher information
Quantum Fisher information

Other measures employed in information theory:
Entropy (information theory)
Kullback–Leibler divergence
Self-information

Notes

References

 
 
 
 
 
 Frieden, B. R. (2004) Science from Fisher Information: A Unification. Cambridge Univ. Press. .
 
 
 
 
 
 
 
 

 
 
  

Estimation theory
Information theory
Design of experiments